Stéphanie Loeuillette (born 27 July 1992) is a French table tennis player. She competed in the women's team event at the 2020 Summer Olympics.

References

External links
 

1992 births
Living people
French female table tennis players
Olympic table tennis players of France
Table tennis players at the 2020 Summer Olympics
Sportspeople from Le Havre
20th-century French women
21st-century French women